The 1984 National League was contested as the second division of Speedway in the United Kingdom.

Summary
The title was won by the Long Eaton Invaders who finished just one point clear of the Mildenhall Fen Tigers.

Final table

National League Knockout Cup
The 1984 National League Knockout Cup was the 17th edition of the Knockout Cup for tier two teams. Hackney Kestrels were the winners of the competition.

First round

Quarter-finals

Semi-finals

Final
First leg

Second leg

Hackney were declared Knockout Cup Champions, winning on aggregate 83–72.

Leading averages

Riders & final averages
Arena Essex

Bob Humphreys 7.19
Alan Sage 7.19
Martin Goodwin 7.10
David Smart 6.25
Bill Barrett 6.02
David Cheshire 5.61
Jeremy Luckhurst 4.81
Peter Johns 4.77
Steve Collins 1.33

Berwick

Steve McDermott 9.97
Bruce Cribb 9.24 
Jimmy McMillan 8.73 
Charlie McKinna 6.65 
Phil Kynman 6.21
Craig Pendlebury 5.40
David Walsh 5.34
Rob Grant Sr 5.10
Mike Caroline 3.64
Dennis Gallagher 3.64
Paul Cooper 3.58
Jacko Irving 2.50

Boston

Colin Cook 7.26
Rob Hollingworth 7.16
Guy Wilson 7.11
David Gagen 7.03
Dennis Mallett 6.67
Billy Burton 6.44
Paul Clarke 5.63
Steve Lomas 5.14
Pete Chapman 4.40

Canterbury

Jamie Luckhurst 8.11
Alan Mogridge 7.69
Dave Mullett 7.61 
Barney Kennett 6.73 
Rob Tilbury 5.72
Kevin Brice 5.59
Andy Fines 5.16
Keith Pritchard 5.13
Neville Tatum 4.79

Edinburgh

Bobby Beaton 9.30
Mark Fiora 9.10
Dave Trownson 7.67
Craig Pendlebury 6.39
Sean Courtney 6.00
Roger Lambert 5.85
Brett Saunders 5.40
Paul McHale 4.48
Phil Jeffrey 4.31
Martin Johnson 2.78

Glasgow

Steve Lawson 10.38
Andy Reid 7.64
Brian Collins 6.58 
Colin Caffrey 6.11
Martin McKinna 5.44
Jim Beaton 4.55
David Cassels 3.26
Tam Baggley 2.75
Barry Ayres 2.67
Geoff Powell 2.59

Hackney

Barry Thomas 8.44
Kevin Teager 7.34
Andy Galvin 6.01
Mark Terry 5.22
Linden Warner 5.16
Paul Whittaker 4.98

Long Eaton

Dave Perks 8.99 
Paul Stead 8.75 
Graham Drury 8.50 
David Tyler 7.37
Chris Pidcock 6.96
Miles Evans 5.83
Mark Stevenson 5.41
John Frankland 5.35

Middlesbrough

Steve Wilcock 9.71 
Mike Spink 8.50
Geoff Pusey 7.26 
Paul Price 5.70
Pete Smith 4.87
Mark Crang 4.75
Jim Burdfield 4.68
Ashley Norton 4.24
Rob Carter 3.22
John Place 2.06

Mildenhall

Carl Baldwin 9.11
Carl Blackbird 8.97
Robert Henry 8.42
Ray Bales 7.89 
Dave Jackson 5.29
Wally Hill 4.64
Rob Parish 3.70
Ian Farnham 2.67

Milton Keynes

Keith White 8.84 
Kevin Smart 8.39
David Blackburn 7.36
Paul Clarke 6.75
Nigel De'ath 6.38
Steve Payne 5.89
Peter Framingham 5.18
Rob Wall 4.94
Chris Hunt 2.93

Peterborough

Mick Hines 7.51
Dave Allen 6.98
Ian Barney 6.96
Andy Fisher 6.36
Keith Millard 6.25
Adrian Hume 5.86
Mike Spinks 4.65
Neil Cotton 4.32
Lawrie Bloomfield 3.90
Mike Smart 2.56

Rye House

Bobby Garrad 8.69
Andrew Silver 7.79
Steve Naylor 7.69
Kelvin Mullarkey 7.10
Kerry Gray 5.71
Steve Bryenton 5.46
Chris Chaplin 4.93
Michael Keepe 3.86
Mark Chessell 3.70
Gary Rolls 3.31

Scunthorpe

Julian Parr 8.11
Andy Buck 7.80
Rob Woffinden 7.65
Derek Richardson 7.5
Paul Evitts 6.64
Mike Wilding 6.06
Kevin Armitage 5.54
Ian Gibson 4.73
Mark Burrows 3.94
Richie Owen 2.43

Stoke

Tom Owen 9.86
Nigel Crabtree 9.56 
Paul Thorp 7.26
Paul Evitts 6.47
Steve Bishop 5.47
Ashley Pullen 5.46
Graham Jones 5.09
Phil Alderman 5.00
Ian Stead 4.25

Weymouth

Martin Yeates 10.35
Alun Rossiter 9.23
David Biles 7.06
John Barker 6.84
Kevin Price 5.21
Gordon Humphreys 4.28
Mike Semmonds 4.10
Michael Coles 3.78
Ian Humphreys 3.62
Dave Gibbs 3.55
Terry Mussett 2.92
Wayne Barrett 1.09

See also
List of United Kingdom Speedway League Champions
Knockout Cup (speedway)

References

Oakes, Peter (1991) The Complete History of the British League, Front Page Books, p. 17 (Division Two section)

Speedway British League Division Two / National League